Spencer Brown may refer to:

Sportspeople
Spencer Brown (offensive tackle) (born 1998), American football offensive tackle
Spencer Brown (running back) (born 1998), American football running back
Spencer Brown (fighter) (born 1997), Scottish fighter
Spencer Brown (rugby union, born 1921) (1921–c. 1973), rugby union player who represented Australia
Spencer Brown (rugby union, born 1973), English rugby union player

Others
Spencer Brown (comedian), English comedian, actor and writer
Spencer Brown (musician) (born 1994), American musician
Spencer Kellogg Brown (1842–1863), American Civil War spy
Spencer Wharton Brown (1918–1977), American professor and cyto-geneticist

See also
G. Spencer-Brown (1923–2016), English polymath best known as the author of Laws of Form